Dear Friend: Karibal is a 2009 Philippine television drama series broadcast by GMA Network. It is the seventh installment of Dear Friend.

Plot
Cheska (Jennylyn Mercado) falls in love with her boss Darrell (Wendell Ramos). But their age differences and Cheska's immature and childish nature hamper their relationship. The two constantly engage in verbal battles.

In a few chance encounters, Claire (Jean Garcia) meets Darrell and sparks fly between the two. During Darrell's predicament over his love life, he finds consolation in Claire, who is more mature and understanding beyond her years. What's more, Claire is smarter and more charming compared to Cheska.

Soon, Darrell discovers that Claire is Cheska's mom. And that's when things really get complicated. This revelation marks a deep estrangement between mother and daughter.

Can Claire and Cheska bridge the gap that tarnished their relationship? How will Darrell resolve the conflict between the two women who play important roles in his life? As the mother and daughter relationship is tested, can this still be saved?

Cast and characters

 Jennylyn Mercado as Cheska
 Jean Garcia as Claire
 Wendell Ramos as Darrell
 Hero Angeles as Junby

References

2009 Philippine television series debuts
2009 Philippine television series endings
Filipino-language television shows
GMA Network drama series
Television shows set in the Philippines